Géza Hollósi (2 May 1938 – 6 September 2002) was a Hungarian wrestler. He competed at the 1960 Summer Olympics, the 1964 Summer Olympics and the 1968 Summer Olympics.

References

1938 births
2002 deaths
Hungarian male sport wrestlers
Olympic wrestlers of Hungary
Wrestlers at the 1960 Summer Olympics
Wrestlers at the 1964 Summer Olympics
Wrestlers at the 1968 Summer Olympics
Martial artists from Budapest